Ahmad Mohammad El Khodor (born 30 November 1984) is a Lebanese former footballer who played as centre-back. He represented Lebanon internationally between 2008 and 2010.

Club career 
In summer 2007, El Khodor joined Ansar from Tadamon Sour ahead of the 2007–08 Lebanese Premier League. He also played for Irshad Chehim.

International career 
El Khodor is of Palestinian descent; he represented Lebanon internationally, both at under-23 and senior levels.

See also
 List of Lebanon international footballers born outside Lebanon

References

External links
 
 

1984 births
Living people
Lebanese people of Palestinian descent
Lebanese footballers
Association football central defenders
Tadamon Sour SC players
Al Ansar FC players
Al Irshad Club Chehim players
Lebanese Premier League players
Lebanon youth international footballers
Lebanon international footballers